Paola Moreira Irizarry (born ) is a Puerto Rican female artistic gymnast, representing her nation at international competitions. 

She competed at world championships, including the 2015 World Artistic Gymnastics Championships in Glasgow.

References

External links
https://database.fig-gymnastics.com/public/gymnasts/biography/18136/true?backUrl=%2Fpublic%2Fresults%2Fdisplay%2F5346%3FidAgeCategory%3D4%26idCategory%3D68%23anchor_49375
https://thegymter.net/2014/08/18/2014-youth-olympic-games-qualification-1/
http://www.arabianpunchfront.com/2014/07/2nd-youth-olympic-games.html
http://gymtertainment.blogspot.com/
http://chimgym.blogspot.com.br/2014/07/2nd-youth-olympic-games.html
http://www.epa.eu/sports-photos/sports-events-photos/nanjing-2014-youth-olympic-games-photos-51525807
https://www.youtube.com/watch?v=iwWbfk-We9s

1999 births
Living people
Puerto Rican female artistic gymnasts
Place of birth missing (living people)
Gymnasts at the 2014 Summer Youth Olympics